Ricardo Valderrama Fernández (3 April 1945 – 30 August 2020) was a Peruvian anthropologist, scholar, and politician. Valderrama spent more than 40 years studying the lives of the Indigenous peoples of the Andes region surrounding Cusco. In 1977, he released his first book, "Gregorio Condori Mamani: An Autobiography", co-authored with his wife, anthropologist Carmen Escalante. Their book, which has been translated into seven languages, is considered a landmark in the field of Peruvian anthropology, as it focused on modern-day individuals within the lower classes of society.

Valderrama became Mayor of Cusco Province in December 2019, following the resignation of his predecessor, . Valderrama oversaw the provincial response to the COVID-19 pandemic in Cusco Province during the COVID-19 pandemic in Peru, which includes the city of Cusco, until his death in office from the virus in August 2020.

Awards
 Guggenheim Fellowship - awarded in 2000

References

1945 births
2020 deaths
Provincial Mayors of Cusco Province
Peruvian anthropologists
Mayors of places in Peru
Pontifical Catholic University of Peru alumni
People from Cusco
People from Cusco Province
Deaths from the COVID-19 pandemic in Peru